"Love Generation" is a song by French music producer and DJ Bob Sinclar, featuring vocals by Gary Pine, from the French artist's fourth studio album, Western Dream. The single was released in September 2005 through the Yellow Productions label and became a hit in Europe and Australia, topping the charts of five countries as well as the Hungarian and US dance charts. It was less popular in the United Kingdom, reaching number 12 there, and was featured on many Ministry of Sound albums of the time and had much rotation on MTV Dance. In 2006, a new version that featured the 2006 FIFA World Cup mascot Goleo VI was released.

Music video
The music video is inspired by the music video for "Sweet Lullaby" by Deep Forest. Both videos feature children riding their bicycle across different locations, greeting the local people and sampling the local cultures and atmosphere.

The music video, which appears to have been shot at various locations in the United States, starts with a young boy (played by David Beaudoin, who stars in numerous Bob Sinclar videos) waking up one seemingly ordinary morning. He gets himself ready and goes out on his bike to school. He arrives outside the entrance and pauses, apparently in thought. Then he rides the bike on, past the school, and partakes on a trip to many different and exotic locations all over the USA including New York City, Los Angeles and San Francisco. He waves to people he passes, rests occasionally for refreshments and to admire his surroundings, before riding on. The man watering his lawn is Sinclar.

Eventually he ends up back at his home at the time he usually gets back from school. He embraces and chats animatedly to his mother, and she brings him to bed later. He looks thoughtfully at the globe at his bedside table, before rolling over to sleep. Overall the video has a very upbeat story, an adventure in the wild outdoors, and how a boy spreads love all over his nation.

FIFA version
The special release Bob Sinclar presents Goleo VI featuring Gary "Nesta" Pine was on 9 December 2005 to coincide with the draws for the 2006 FIFA World Cup.

The song was used throughout the World Cup event the following year. The animated mascot Goleo VI and Pille appear both on the cover of FIFA single release and in the music video launched.

Other use
In 2009, the song was used in several versions, edits and mixes by Canada's Interprovincial Lottery Corporation as theme song to advertise the Lotto Max lottery.

Track listings
 "Love Generation" (Radio Edit)
 "Love Generation" (Club Mix)
 "Love Generation" (Full Intention Mix)
 "Love Generation" (Full Intention Dub)
 "Love Generation" (Ron Carroll Black Church Feeling)
 "Love Generation" (Kenny Dope Gutta Remix)

 Australasian release
 "Love Generation" (Radio Edit)
 "Love Generation" (Extended Club Version)

Chart performance
The song was a No. 1 hit in countries such as Australia, Austria, Germany and Belgium and made the top fifteen in several other countries such as Denmark, Finland, France, Hungary, Italy, Netherlands, New Zealand, Norway, Spain, Sweden and Switzerland.

Weekly charts

Year-end charts

Decade-end charts

Certifications

Release history

References

External links
 "Love Generation" Official Music Video

Bob Sinclar songs
2005 singles
2005 songs
House music songs
Number-one singles in Germany
Number-one singles in Australia
Songs written by Bob Sinclar
Songs written by Duane Harden
Yellow Productions singles
FIFA World Cup songs